Davide Gualtieri (born 27 April 1971) is a Sammarinese former footballer who played as a forward. He scored the second fastest goal in FIFA World Cup qualification history, against England on 17 November 1993. Gualtieri held the fastest goal record for over 23 years.

In the match, which took place in Bologna, Italy, San Marino had the kick off and the ball was quickly played through the inside right channel. England defender Stuart Pearce attempted a back pass to goalkeeper David Seaman. Pearce's pass was under hit, and Gualtieri ran on to touch the ball past Seaman. 

The goal was timed at 8.3 seconds, which remained the fastest World Cup goal scored in either qualifying or the finals, until Christian Benteke scored after 8.1 seconds for Belgium against Gibraltar on 16 March 2017. England took twenty minutes to equalise, but eventually won the match 7–1. It is falsely believed that Gualtieri’s goal eliminated England from qualifying for the 1994 World Cup, as England needed to win by 7 clear goals, however the result was immaterial as England were also relying on Poland to beat The Netherlands,  which they failed to do.

Gualtieri continued to play for the San Marino national team until 2000, when he retired due to injury. He now works as a computer salesman in San Marino. In 2020, he appeared on the TV series Harry's Heroes: Euro Having a Laugh, assembling a Sanmarinese team to play against a team of 90s England players once more.

References

External links
Davide Gualtieri: The man from San Marino who shocked England

1971 births
Living people
Sammarinese footballers
San Marino international footballers
Association football forwards